Saint-Momelin is a commune in the Nord department in northern France.

Heraldry

See also
Communes of the Nord department

References

Saintmomelin
Nord communes articles needing translation from French Wikipedia